A Statute Concerning Diet and Apparel (37 Edw. III c. 1, 3 - 19) was a sumptuary law introduced by the Parliament of England in 1363. It was one of a series of laws over a couple of centuries that form what are known as the Acts of Apparel.

The Act detailed the style of dress that people of each class were allowed to wear. It was created to tackle a burgeoning trend for the lower classes to wear similar fashion to the elite. This was triggered by the sudden rise in personal wealth that followed the Black Death, caused by the consolidation of property following the drop in population and the considerable rises in wages which liberated many previously bonded labourers.

References

External links
 http://www.the-tudors.org.uk/tudor-sumptuary-laws.htm

History of clothing (Western fashion)
Clothing controversies
Medieval English law
Acts of the Parliament of England
1360s in law
1363 in England